A siege of Martyropolis occurred in Autumn of 531 during the Iberian War between the Sasanian Empire under Kavadh I and Byzantine Empire under Justinian I.

A Roman raid from Martyropolis triggered the Sasanians to launch a siege on the newly fortified frontier city. Initially, the Sasanians had the upper hand, but a series of political events and logistical issues led them to withdraw. It was the last conflict of the Iberian War.

Background
Earlier, the Sasanian king Kavadh I had ordered a campaign which resulted in a battle at Callinicum. Although the Persians were victorious, the victory was narrow, and no fortress was captured, thus making the campaign inconclusive. Both Belisarius and Azarethes, the Byzantine and Sasanian generals at Callinicum, respectively, were dismissed due to the high casualties of this battle. Emperor Justinian I then appointed Sittas as strategos in charge of the east.

At this time, Justinian's policy was to bolster the Roman position and at the same time trying to make a truce with the Persians.

In Mesopotamia, Bessas had recently been appointed as dux Mesopotamiae with the frontier city of Martyropolis as his base, which was recently fortified by emperor Justinian I. From there, he performed a successful raid into the Sasanian border land of Arzanene, killing hundreds.

The siege

This led the Sasanians to lay siege on Martyropolis with a capable force under three veteran generals, Adergoudounbades ("Chanaranges"), Bawi ("Aspebedes"), and Mihr-Mihroe. Roman garrison force was commanded by Bessas and Bouzes. Sittas and his Ghassanid ally Al-Harith ibn Jabalah were stationed near the city, but avoided engagement since the Persians had the upper hand in the conflict.

However, a series of political events, including the death of Kavadh I and the perceived threat of Huns, as well as the arrival of winter and the presence of Roman reinforcements at Amida all led the Sasanian field commanders to abandon the siege and agree on an armistice.

Aftermath

Justinian I and the new Sasanian king Khosrow I signed a peace treaty dubbed Perpetual Peace a year later, ending the Iberian War.

References

 Greatrex, Geoffrey; Lieu, Samuel N. C. (2002). The Roman Eastern Frontier and the Persian Wars (Part II, 363–630 AD). London: Routledge. , p. 95

Iberian War
530s in the Byzantine Empire
6th century in Iran
Battles of the Roman–Sasanian Wars
530s conflicts
Sieges involving the Sasanian Empire
Sieges involving the Byzantine Empire
Martyropolis
Sieges of the Roman–Persian Wars